Aciphylla colensoi is a species of Aciphylla, commonly known as giant speargrass, Spaniard, or its Māori-language name . Yellow flowers may also be present, located on long, strong stems.

Taxonomy & naming
Joseph Hooker first described the plant in 1864. The specific epithet, colensoi, honours William Colenso.

Distribution
It is found on both the North and South Islands of New Zealand.

References

External links
Royal New Zealand Institute of Horticulture article on A. colensoi

Apioideae
Flora of New Zealand
Taxa named by Joseph Dalton Hooker
Plants described in 1864